Ulay Ze Ani (English translation: Maybe it's Me) is the debut album of the Israeli artist Yoni Bloch, released in 2004. The band members that accompany Bloch in this album are Tomer Lahav (Guitar), Or Zovelski (Drums), Tal Kirshboim (Bass guitar), Karolin Lavel (Cello), John Mathias (Viola and Violin) and Efrat Gosh (singing and vocals). Most of the texts of the album were written by Barak Feldaman, in cooperation with Bloch. The songs combine characteristics of rock music, such as electric guitar and yells, along with melodic Piano solos, played by Bloch himself. Some of the album songs released before the official album release, in Bama Hadasha website.

Song list

References 

2004 debut albums
Yoni Bloch albums